Morten Finstad (born May 24, 1967) is a Norwegian former ice hockey player.

Finstad spent his entire career playing for Stjernen Hockey between 1986 and 2001.  He played for the Norwegian national ice hockey team, and  participated at the Winter Olympics in 1994. He was awarded Gullpucken as best Norwegian ice hockey player in 1998.

References

External links

1967 births
Living people
Ice hockey players at the 1994 Winter Olympics
Norwegian ice hockey centres
Olympic ice hockey players of Norway
Sportspeople from Fredrikstad
Stjernen Hockey players